Sông Đốc is a town (thị trấn) in Trần Văn Thời District, Cà Mau Province, in Vietnam.

Populated places in Cà Mau province
Communes of Cà Mau province
Townships in Vietnam